Ichawaynochaway Creek is a creek in southwest Georgia.

Ichawaynochaway was a Muskogee word that may have referred to either beavers or deer; it likely meant "the place where the deer sleep."

The creek rises in Webster County. The west fork of the creek enters Stewart County briefly; the forks combine in Randolph County and the creek flows through Randolph and Terrell counties, forming the southern part of their boundary. It flows through Calhoun County and enters Baker County, where it joins the Flint.

Ichawaynochaway Creek is commonly referred to as Notchaway Creek.

References

Ichawaynochaway
Rivers of Baker County, Georgia
Rivers of Calhoun County, Georgia
Rivers of Randolph County, Georgia
Rivers of Georgia (U.S. state)
Rivers of Stewart County, Georgia
Rivers of Webster County, Georgia
Rivers of Terrell County, Georgia